Kilcashel Stone Fort is a double court cairn and National Monument located in County Mayo, Ireland, 800m (½ mile) southeast of Kilmovee. The last surviving member of three stone forts in the area, it's estimated to have been constructed between 2,500 and 500BC.

Description
A souterrain is located inside, as well as a bullaun and the sites of two collapsed houses.

References

National Monuments in County Mayo
Archaeological sites in County Mayo